{{Infobox song
| name       = Chicago
| cover      = Chicago_-_Frank_Sinatra.jpg
| alt        =
| type       = single
| artist     = Frank Sinatra
| album      =
| A-side     = All the Way
| released   = October 1957
| recorded   = 1957
| studio     =
| venue      =
| genre      = Vocal jazz, swing, traditional pop
| length     = 2:10
| label      = Capitol Records
| writer     = Fred Fisher
| producer   = Nelson Riddle
| prev_title = You're Cheatin' Yourself (If You're Cheatin' on Me)
| prev_year  = 1957
| next_title = Witchcraft
| next_year  = 1958
}}

"Chicago" is a popular song written by Fred Fisher and published in 1922. The original sheet music variously spelled the title "Todd'ling" or "Toddling." The song has been recorded by many artists, but the best-known versions are by Frank Sinatra & Ben Selvin.

The song alludes to the city's colorful past, feigning "... the surprise of my life / I saw a man dancing with his own wife", mentioning evangelist Billy Sunday as having not been able to "shut down" the city, and State Street where "they do things they don't do on Broadway".

The song made a minor appearance on the U.S. pop charts, reaching #84 in the fall of 1957.  It was the first of two charting songs about Chicago recorded by Sinatra. The other was "My Kind of Town" from 1964, which reached U.S. #110.

Lyrics
As with many similar songs, the lyrics have undergone a number of reworkings. The original third verse included the lines, "More Colored people up in State Street you can see,/ Than you'll see in Louisiana or Tennessee" and makes reference to the Chicago Stockyards. Later recordings have a number of replacements: Of all versions, Judy Garland's 1961 Judy at Carnegie Hall concert recording contains more references than most: Marshall Field's department store, the Drake Hotel, the Chicago Loop, The Pump Room at the Ambassador East hotel, and even Mrs O'Leary's Cow.

Chart history

Film appearances
1937 - Instrumental version played over opening credits of 1933 film, Little Giant with Edward G. Robinson; also reprised later in the film. 
1939 - featured in H.C. Potter's 1939 film, The Story of Vernon and Irene Castle, starring Ginger Rogers and Fred Astaire.
1942 - the song was featured in the opening and closing credits of the 1942 movie Roxie Hart starring Ginger Rogers and Adolphe Menjou.
1949 - included in the fictionalized biography of Fred Fisher, Oh, You Beautiful Doll.
1952 - used in the 1952 film With a Song in My Heart.
1957 - performed by Frank Sinatra in a 1957 movie in which he starred, The Joker Is Wild. His separately-recorded rendition (i.e., not the same version that is in the film) is the only charting version of the song.
1974 - appears in the film Harry and Tonto.

Recorded versions
Synco Jazz Band (Joseph Samuels) (Aug 10, 1922)
Ben Selvin
Jamey Aebersold
Ann-Margret
George Barnes
Luis Barreiro
Count Basie
Laura Benanti - The Playboy ClubTony Bennett
Pierre Blanchard
Claude Bolling
Boston Pops Orchestra
James Brown
Dave Brubeck
John Bunch
Benny Carter
Chicago - Night and Day: Big-Band (1995)
Rosemary Clooney
Bing Crosby for his 1957 album New Tricks.
Graham Dalby & the Grahamophones
Sammy Davis Jr.
Jimmy Dorsey
Tommy Dorsey
John Eaton
Duke Ellington
Bob Florence
Pete Fountain
Sergio Franchi (in Italian) on his 1964 RCA single
Bud Freeman
Jackie and Roy
Judy Garland on her double LP Judy at Carnegie Hall (1961) and the studio album Judy in London (1972, rec. 1960)
The Georgians (1922)
Harry Goldson
Nat Gonella & His Georgians (unrelated to the 1922 Georgians)
Benny Goodman
Stéphane Grappelli
Coleman Hawkins
Earl Hines
Mimi Hines
Franz Jackson
Milt Jackson
Jazzbo's Carolina Serenaders
Jive Bunny & the Mastermixers
Al Jolson
Greetje Kauffeld
François Laudet
Lead Belly
Joe Lovano
Billy May
Dudley Moore
Jaye P. Morgan
Jack Mudurian
Bill O'Connell
Anita O'Day
Original Piano Trio
Oscar Peterson
Louis Prima
Quintet of the Hot Club of France
Lou Rawls
Django Reinhardt
Buddy Rich
Tony Sandler
Bob Scobey
The Sentimental Strings
John Serry Sr. and his ensemble (See RCA Thesaurus).
Screeching Weasel
Ray Sherman
Victor Silvester
Frank Sinatra - Come Fly with Me (1958)
Muggsy Spanier
The Starlite Orchestra
Wally Stott and his Orchestra
Barbara Sutton Curtis
George Holmes Tate
Gary Tesca
Rufus Wainwright - Rufus Does Judy at Carnegie Hall (2007)
Paul Whiteman and His Orchestra
World's Greatest Jazz Band
Wurlitzer Band Organ
Wurlitzer Model 165 Band Organ
Penn Glee Club
George Scott Wood's Six Swingers

Live covers
 Green Day during a concert at Chicago's United Center on July 13, 2009
 Sergio Franchi recorded this song in Italian during his concert in 1965 for RCA Victor, Live at The Coconut Grove CM Punk at the end of the 27 June 2011 edition of Monday Night Raw''

References

External links
 Sheet music in the Lilly Library collection at Indiana University
 

1922 songs
1957 singles
Capitol Records singles
RCA Victor singles
Songs written by Fred Fisher
Songs about Chicago
Frank Sinatra songs
Judy Garland songs
Tony Bennett songs